RASTOK (also known as Urban Music Fest RASTOK) is an annual summer music festival on Plateau Rastoke in Jelah, Bosnia and Herzegovina. It has been staged annually since 2003, usually on the first weekend of August.

In the beginning the festival was for rock bands, but coverage spread to punk, alternative rock, metal, dub, reggae, ska, jazz and other fusions of urban sound. The festival was held in Jelah under the name Jelah Summer.

Organizers
UMF Rastok Organizer is a united youth organization of young people from Jelah. The festival, organized by activists from JOM and a large number of volunteers, is for mostly young people from Bosnia and Herzegovina and other countries.

History

Rock Festival Rastok 2003
Rock Festival Rastok 2003 was held on the town square in Jelah on 29 and 30 July 2003.

Urban Music Fest Rastok 2006
Urban Music Fest Rastok 2006 was held on the Rastoke plateau, Jelah on 4 and 5 August 2006:

Urban Music Fest Rastok 2008
Urban Music Fest Rastok 2008 was held on the on Rastoke plateau, Jelah on 2 and 3 August 2008:

Urban Music Fest Rastok 2009
Promo Urban Music Fest Rastok 2009 was held on the Sports court in Jelah on 13 July 2009 while Urban Music Fest Rastok 2009 was held on 30 June and 1 August 2009 at the Rastoke Plateau, Jelah.

Urban Music Fest Rastok 2010
Urban Music Fest Rastok 2010 was held on the Rastoke plateau, Jelah on 2 August 2010.

References

External links
  Rastok Festival official website
  Jedinstvena organizacija mladih - United youth organization

Tourism in Bosnia and Herzegovina
Electronic music festivals in Bosnia and Herzegovina
Summer events in Bosnia and Herzegovina